The 1913 Tennessee Volunteers football team represented the University of Tennessee in the 1913 Southern Intercollegiate Athletic Association football season.  The Volunteers had a winning record for the first time since 1908 and won their first Southern Intercollegiate Athletic Association game since 1910.

Schedule

Season summary

Vanderbilt
Red Rainey scored Tennessee's touchdown. Goat Carroll missed the kick.  Tennessee's right guard S. D. Bayer drew a 33-yard, half the distance to the goal penalty for slugging, and was ejected by umpire Bradley Walker. The first down after, Hord Boensch threw a touchdown pass to Enoch Brown. Brown ran the last ten yards shaking off several defenders. Boensch kicked goal and won the game for Vanderbilt.

References

Tennessee
Tennessee Volunteers football seasons
Tennessee Volunteers football